Mary Ann Liebert, Inc. is a privately held independent publishing company founded by its president, Mary Ann Liebert, in 1980. The company publishes peer-reviewed academic journals, books, and trade magazines in the areas of biotechnology, biomedical sciences, medical research, and life sciences; clinical medicine, surgery, and nursing; technology and engineering; environmental science; public health and policy; law, regulation, and education.

The company's headquarters is in New Rochelle, New York.

The company has been described as the first to establish a specialty in genetic engineering.

Publications

Eschewing traditional market research, the publisher seeks out niche topics overlooked by larger publishers. As of 2000, its portfolio of  more than ninety peer-reviewed journals included:

Publications focused on topics outside of the medical field include Westchester Wag, which covers the social scene in Westchester County, New York, and Rinkmagazine, a skating periodical.

History 

The company's first publication was the Journal of Interferon Research, launched in 1981. Genetic Engineering News was launched the same year, attaining a circulation of 50,000 by 2000. The combined circulation of all titles from the publisher in 2000 was 250,000.

The company's top five publications by revenue as of 2000 were Genetic Engineering News (50,000), Westchester Wag (50,000), Journal of Women's Health and Gender-Based Medicine (5,000), Human Gene Therapy (2,300), and AIDS Research and Human Retrovirus (2,150).

In February 2018, the company launched The CRISPR Journal, a bimonthly journal devoted to research advances and commentary in the field of CRISPR and genome editing.

See also 

OMICS (journal)
:Category:Mary Ann Liebert academic journals

References

External links
 

Academic publishing companies
Publishing companies of the United States
Companies based in New Rochelle, New York
American publishers (people)
Publishing companies established in 1980
1980 establishments in New York (state)